Jonathan David Haidt (born October 19, 1963) is an American social psychologist and author. He is the Thomas Cooley Professor of Ethical Leadership at the New York University Stern School of Business. His main areas of study are the psychology of morality and moral emotions.

Haidt's main scientific contributions come from the psychological field of moral foundations theory, which attempts to explain the evolutionary origins of human moral reasoning on the basis of innate, gut feelings rather than logic and reason. The theory was later extended to explain the different moral reasoning and how they relate to political ideology, with different political orientations prioritizing different sets of morals. The research served as a foundation for future books on various topics.

Haidt has written three books for general audiences: The Happiness Hypothesis: Finding Modern Truth in Ancient Wisdom (2006) explores the relationship between ancient philosophies and modern science; The Righteous Mind: Why Good People are Divided by Politics and Religion (2012) examines how morality is shaped by emotion and intuition more than by reasoning, and why differing political groups have different notions of right and wrong; and The Coddling of the American Mind: How Good Intentions and Bad Ideas Are Setting Up a Generation for Failure (2018), co-written with Greg Lukianoff, explores the rising political polarization and changing culture on college campuses, and its effects on mental health.

Haidt has attracted both support and criticism for his critique of the current state of universities and his interpretation of progressive values. He has been named one of the "top global thinkers" by Foreign Policy magazine, and one of the "top world thinkers" by Prospect magazine. He is among the most cited researchers in political and moral psychology, and is considered among the top 25 most influential living psychologists.

Biography 
Haidt is Jewish and was born in New York City, and raised in Scarsdale, New York. His grandparents were immigrants from Russia and Poland.

Education and career 
Haidt received a BA in philosophy from Yale University in 1985, and a PhD in psychology from the University of Pennsylvania in 1992. He then studied cultural psychology at the University of Chicago as a postdoctoral fellow, supervised by Jonathan Baron and Alan Fiske (at the University of Pennsylvania), and cultural anthropologist Richard Shweder (University of Chicago). At Shweder's suggestion, he visited Orissa, India, to continue his research. In 1995, Haidt was hired as an assistant professor at the University of Virginia, where he worked until 2011, winning four awards for teaching, including a statewide award conferred by the Governor of Virginia.

In 1999, Haidt became active in the new field of positive psychology, studying positive moral emotions. This work led to the publication of an edited volume, titled Flourishing, in 2003. In 2004, Haidt began to apply moral psychology to the study of politics, doing research on the psychological foundations of ideology. This work led to the publication in 2012 of The Righteous Mind. Haidt spent the 2007–2008 academic year at Princeton University as the Visiting Professor for Distinguished Teaching.

In 2011, Haidt moved to New York University Stern School of Business as the Thomas Cooley Professor of Ethical Leadership. In 2013, he co-founded Ethical Systems, a non-profit collaboration dedicated to making academic research on ethics widely available to businesses. In 2015, Haidt co-founded Heterodox Academy, a non-profit organization that works to increase viewpoint diversity, mutual understanding, and productive disagreement. In 2018, Haidt and Richard Reeves co-edited an illustrated edition of John Stuart Mill's On Liberty, titled All Minus One: John Stuart Mill’s Ideas on Free Speech Illustrated (illustrated by Dave Cicirelli). Haidt's current research applies moral psychology to business ethics.

Research contributions 

Haidt's research on morality has led to publications and theoretical advances in four key areas.

Moral disgust 

Together with Paul Rozin and Clark McCauley, Haidt developed the Disgust Scale, which has been widely used to measure individual differences in sensitivity to disgust. Haidt, Rozin, and McCauley have written on the psychology of disgust as an emotion that began as a guardian of the mouth (against pathogens), but then expanded during biological and cultural evolution to become a guardian of the body more generally, and of the social and moral order.

Moral elevation 

With Sara Algoe, Haidt argued that exposure to stories about moral beauty (the opposite of moral disgust) cause a common set of responses, including warm, loving feelings, calmness, and a desire to become a better person. Haidt called the emotion moral elevation, as a tribute to Thomas Jefferson, who had described the emotion in detail in a letter discussing the benefits of reading great literature. Feelings of moral elevation cause increases in milk produced during lactation in breastfeeding mothers, suggesting the involvement of the hormone oxytocin. There is now a large body of research on elevation and related emotions.

Social intuitionism 

Haidt's principal line of research has been on the nature and mechanisms of moral judgment. In the 1990s, he developed the social intuitionist model, which posits that moral judgment is mostly based on automatic processes—moral intuitions—rather than on conscious reasoning. People engage in reasoning largely to find evidence to support their initial intuitions. Haidt's main paper on the social intuitionist model, "The Emotional Dog and its Rational Tail", has been cited over 7,800 times.

Moral foundations theory 

In 2004, Haidt began to extend the social intuitionist model to identify what he considered to be the most important categories of moral intuition. The resulting moral foundations theory, co-developed with Craig Joseph and Jesse Graham, and based in part on the writings of Richard Shweder, was intended to explain cross-cultural differences in morality. The theory posited that there are at least five innate moral foundations, upon which cultures develop their various moralities, just as there are five innate taste receptors on the tongue, which cultures have used to create many different cuisines. The five values are:

 Care/harm
 Fairness/cheating
 Loyalty/betrayal
 Authority/subversion
 Sanctity/degradation.

Haidt and his collaborators asserted that the theory also works well to explain political differences. According to Haidt, liberals tend to endorse primarily the care and fairness foundations, whereas conservatives tend to endorse all foundations more equally. Later, in The Righteous Mind, a sixth foundation, Liberty/oppression, was presented.

"The Elephant and the Rider"

One widely cited metaphor throughout Haidt's books is that of the elephant and the rider. His observations of social intuitionism, the notion that intuitions come first and rationalization second, led to the metaphor described in his work. The rider represents consciously controlled processes, and the elephant represents automatic processes. The metaphor corresponds to Systems 1 and 2 described in Daniel Kahneman's Thinking, Fast and Slow. This metaphor is used extensively in both The Happiness Hypothesis and The Righteous Mind.

Non-academic works 
Haidt has authored the following non-academic books for general audiences, related to various subjects in psychology and politics.

The Happiness Hypothesis 

The Happiness Hypothesis: Finding Modern Truth in Ancient Wisdom (2006) draws on ancient philosophical ideas in light of contemporary scientific research to extract potential lessons and how they may apply to everyday life. The book poses "ten Great Ideas" on happiness espoused by philosophers and thinkers of the past — Plato, Marcus Aurelius, Buddha, Jesus, and others — and then considers what modern scientific research has to say regarding these ideas.

The Righteous Mind 

The Righteous Mind: Why Good People Are Divided by Politics and Religion (2012) draws on Haidt's previous research on moral foundations theory. It argues that moral judgments arise not from logical reason, but from gut feelings, asserting that liberals, conservatives, and libertarians have different intuitions about right and wrong because they prioritize different values.

The Coddling of the American Mind 

The Coddling of the American Mind: How Good Intentions and Bad Ideas Are Setting Up a Generation for Failure (2018), co-written with Greg Lukianoff, expands on an essay the authors wrote for The Atlantic in 2015. The book explores the rising political polarization and changing culture on college campuses and its effects on mental health. It also explores changes in childhood, including the rise of "fearful parenting," the decline of unsupervised play, and the effects of social media in the last decade.

Political views
Haidt describes how he began to study political psychology in order to help the Democratic Party win more elections, and argues that each of the major political groups—conservatives, progressives, and libertarians—have valuable insights and that truth and good policy emerge from the contest of ideas. Since 2012, Haidt has referred to himself as a political centrist.

Haidt is involved with several efforts to help bridge the political divide and reduce political polarization in the United States. In 2007, he founded the website CivilPolitics.org, a clearinghouse for research on political civility. He serves on the advisory boards of Represent.Us., a non-partisan anti-corruption organization; the Acumen Fund, which invests in companies, leaders, and ideas that are changing the way the world tackles poverty; and braverangels.org, a bipartisan group working to reduce political polarization.

In 2019, Haidt argued that there is a "very good chance American democracy will fail, that in the next 30 years we will have a catastrophic failure of our democracy."

Reception 
While himself an atheist, Haidt has argued that religion contains psychological wisdom that can promote human flourishing, and that the New Atheists have themselves succumbed to moralistic dogma. These contentions elicited a variety of responses in a 2007 online debate sponsored by the website Edge. PZ Myers praised the first part of Haidt's essay while disagreeing with his criticism of the New Atheists; Sam Harris criticized Haidt for his perceived obfuscation of harms caused by religion; Michael Shermer praised Haidt; and biologist David Sloan Wilson joined Haidt in criticizing the New Atheists for dismissing the notion that religion is an evolutionary adaptation.

David Mikics of Tablet magazine profiled Haidt as "the high priest of heterodoxy" and praised his work to increase intellectual diversity at universities through Heterodox Academy.

In 2020, Peter Wehner wrote in The Atlantic, "Over the past decade, no one has added more to my understanding of how we think about, discuss, and debate politics and religion than Jonathan Haidt." He added that, "In his own field, in his own way, Jonathan Haidt is trying to heal our divisions and temper some of the hate, to increase our wisdom and understanding, and to urge us to show a bit more compassion toward one another."

Publications

Books 
 2002. Flourishing: Positive Psychology and the Life Well Lived, co-edited with Corey L. M. Keyes. Washington, DC: American Psychological Association. .
 2006. The Happiness Hypothesis: Finding Modern Truth in Ancient Wisdom. Basic Books. .
 2012. The Righteous Mind: Why Good People Are Divided by Politics and Religion. Pantheon. .
 2018. All Minus One: John Stuart Mill’s Ideas on Free Speech Illustrated, co-edited with Richard V. Reeves. New York: Heterodox Academy. . .
 2018. The Coddling of the American Mind: How Good Intentions and Bad Ideas Are Setting Up a Generation for Failure, co-written with Greg Lukianoff. New York City: Penguin Press. . .

Selected articles 
 1993. "Affect, culture, and morality, or is it wrong to eat your dog?" with S. Koller, and M. Dias. Journal of Personality and Social Psychology 65:613–28.
 2001. "The emotional dog and its rational tail: A social intuitionist approach to moral judgment." Psychological Review 108:814–34.
 2005. "Hypnotic disgust makes moral judgments more severe," with T. Wheatley. Psychological Science 16:780–84.
 2007. "The new synthesis in moral psychology." Science 316:998–1002.
 2008. "Disgust," with P. Rozin and C. R. McCauley. Pp. 757–76 in Handbook of Emotions (3rd ed.), edited by M. Lewis, J. Haviland, and L. F. Barrett. New York: Guilford Press.
 2009. "Liberals and conservatives rely on different sets of moral foundations," with J. Graham and B. Nosek. Journal of Personality and Social Psychology 96:1029–46.
 2010. "Morality," with S. Kesebir. Pp. 797–832 in Handbook of Social Psychology (5th ed.), edited by S. Fiske, D. Gilbert, and G. Lindzey. Hoboken, NJ: Wiley.
 2012. "Understanding Libertarian morality: The psychological dispositions of self-identified libertarians," with Ravi Iyer, Spassena Koleva, Jesse Graham, and Peter Ditto. PLoS ONE 7(8):e42366.
 2015. "Ideological diversity will improve psychological science," with José L. Duarte, Jarret T. Crawford, Charlotta Stern, Lee Jussim, and Philip E. Tetlock. Behavioral and Brain Sciences 38:e130.
 2017. "Make business ethics a cumulative science," with L.  Trevino. Nature Human Behaviour 1.

References

External links 

 Jonathan Haidt's Homepage 
 

1963 births
Living people
American people of Polish-Jewish descent
American people of Russian-Jewish descent
American social psychologists
Evolutionary psychologists
Jewish American academics
Moral psychologists
Scientists from New York City
New York University Stern School of Business faculty
Political psychologists
Positive psychologists
Scarsdale High School alumni
University of Pennsylvania alumni
University of Virginia faculty
Yale University alumni
American atheists
21st-century American Jews
Centrism in the United States